Lee Hun  (born 29 April 1986) is a South Korean football forward, who played for Gyeongnam FC in K-League.

Club career statistics

External links 

1986 births
Living people
Association football forwards
South Korean footballers
Gyeongnam FC players
K League 1 players
Footballers from Seoul